Ilg or ILG may refer to:

 Ilg, a surname
 ILG, Inc. an American timeshare company
 Ilgar language
 Independent Label Group
 International Ladies Garment Workers Union
 New Castle Airport, in Delaware, United States

See also
 LLG (disambiguation)